Young Guns is a 1988 American Western action film directed by Christopher Cain and written by John Fusco. The film is the first to be produced by Morgan Creek Productions. The film stars Emilio Estevez, Kiefer Sutherland, Lou Diamond Phillips, Charlie Sheen, Dermot Mulroney, Casey Siemaszko, Terence Stamp, Terry O'Quinn, Brian Keith, a brief cameo by Tom Cruise, and Jack Palance.

The film is a  retelling of the adventures of Billy the Kid during the Lincoln County War, which took place in New Mexico during 1877–78. It was filmed in and around  New Mexico. Historian Paul Hutton called Young Guns the most historically accurate of all Billy the Kid films as of June 1990.  It opened number one at the box office and eventually grossed $56 million against an  $11 million budget. A sequel, Young Guns II, was released in August 1990.

Plot
In 1870s Lincoln County, New Mexico, English cattleman John Tunstall hires a wayward young gunman named Billy to join the "Regulators" who live and work on his ranch: Doc Scurlock, Jose Chavez y Chavez, Dick Brewer, "Dirty" Steve Stephens, and Charlie Bowdre. Tunstall tries to educate and civilize the young men in his employ, and clashes with rival rancher Lawrence Murphy, a well-connected Irishman in league with the corrupt Santa Fe Ring.

One of Murphy's hired hands, McCloskey, joins up with Tunstall, while Doc attempts to court Murphy's ward, Yen Sun. Murphy's men kill Tunstall, leading his lawyer friend Alexander McSween to arrange for the Regulators to be deputized and given warrants for the killers' arrest. Hotheaded Billy challenges Dick's authority as the group's foreman, as the Regulators attempt to take Murphy's henchmen in alive. Instead, Billy guns down several unarmed men, including McCloskey, whom he suspects of still working for Murphy. Newspapers paint the Regulators as a deadly gang headed by a larger-than-life outlaw, "Billy the Kid".

With bounty hunters seeking them all over the West and unsure where to go, Chavez leads the others on a peyote trip. One of the men on their warrants, Buckshot Roberts, tracks them down and a shootout ensues. Roberts barricades himself in an outhouse and kills Dick, leading the others to go on the run, while an injured Doc goes his own way. Chavez reveals that Murphy's corruption led to the deaths of his mother and her Navajo tribe, and urges the others to abandon their need for bloodshed, but Billy takes charge as their new leader, determined to avenge Tunstall.

Doc visits Yen Sun before rejoining the gang, and they kill the corrupt Sheriff William J. Brady and his men. They meet with a furious Alex, who explains that their badges have been revoked. Though they are now wanted men, Billy insists that their actions will bring attention to Murphy's corruption. While Charlie revisits a brothel, Billy kills an arrogant bounty hunter, and the gang escapes to Mexico, where Charlie marries a local woman. Soon-to-be-sheriff Pat Garrett warns Billy that Murphy's men will make an attempt on Alex's life the following day.

At Alex's house in Lincoln, the gang is surrounded by Murphy's men and famed bounty hunter John Kinney. Realizing that they were lured into a trap, the Regulators survive an entire day's shootout. U.S. Army troops arrive, as does Murphy himself with Yen, who runs inside and is reunited with Doc. Murphy orders the soldiers to set fire to the house, while Alex's wife leaves unharmed and Chavez slips away. Trapped in the burning attic, the gang throws Alex's possessions out of the window, including a trunk with Billy inside, allowing him to surprise their attackers.

In the chaos, Chavez returns with their rescued horses, and Charlie and Kinney shoot each other dead. Steve is killed helping Chavez ride away with Doc and Yen, while Alex is gunned down by a Gatling gun, and Billy escapes after shooting Murphy between the eyes. An epilogue from Doc reveals that Chavez took work at a farm in California, Doc moved east and married Yen Sun, Alex's widow became one of the most prominent cattlewomen of all time, and Murphy's ring of corruption collapsed. Billy continued to ride until he was killed by Garrett and buried next to Charlie at Fort Sumner, where someone later carved the epitaph: "PALS".

Cast

In addition, Tom Cruise briefly appears in a nonspeaking role as one of Murphy's henchmen.

Release

Home media
The film was released on VHS on January 4, 1989 and on DVD on March 17, 1998 by Artisan Home Entertainment.

Reception

Box office
The movie was a box-office hit, and grossed $45.7 million in the US and Canada. Internationally it grossed $11 million for a worldwide total of $56 million.

Critical response
The film received mixed reviews from critics. It holds a 42% rating on Rotten Tomatoes based on 38 reviews, with an average rating of 4.6/10 with the consensus: "Young Guns rounds up a posse of attractive young leads, but this cheerfully shallow Brat Pack western ultimately has too much hat and not enough cattle." Metacritic gave the film a score of 50 based on 13 people, indicating "mixed or average reviews". Audiences polled by CinemaScore gave the film an average grade of "A-" on an A+ to F scale.

The movie was deemed closer to history in some ways than earlier cinematic incarnations of the Lincoln County War.  The relationship between Tunstall and Murphy was particularly close to the historical reality (as it was in Chisum).  The killings of Hill and McCloskey are also particularly close to the historical record as well.  The portrayals of Josiah Gordon "Doc" Scurlock, Jose Chavez y Chavez, Richard "Dick" Brewer, and Charlie Bowdre, all of whom are not in earlier cinematic versions of the story are praised, whereas the absence of John Chisum is noticeable.

Sequel

A sequel, titled Young Guns II, was released in 1990.

References

External links

 
 
 
 

1988 films
1988 action films
1988 Western (genre) films
American buddy action films
American Western (genre) films
Biographical films about Billy the Kid
Cultural depictions of Pat Garrett
Lincoln County Wars
Biographical films about criminals
1980s English-language films
Films produced by John Fusco
Films set in New Mexico
Films shot in New Mexico
Films produced by Joe Roth
Films set in the 1870s
20th Century Fox films
Artisan Entertainment films
Morgan Creek Productions films
Vestron Pictures films
Films scored by Anthony Marinelli
Films directed by Christopher Cain
Films with screenplays by John Fusco
1980s American films